The 2018 Hollywood Casino 400 was a Monster Energy NASCAR Cup Series race held on October 21, 2018, at Kansas Speedway in Kansas City, Kansas. Contested over 267 laps on the 1.5 mile (2.4 km) intermediate speedway, it was the 32nd race of the 2018 Monster Energy NASCAR Cup Series season, sixth race of the Playoffs, and final race of the Round of 12.

Report

Background

Kansas Speedway is a  tri-oval race track in Kansas City, Kansas. It was built in 2001 and it currently hosts two annual NASCAR race weekends. The Verizon IndyCar Series also raced at here until 2011. The speedway is owned and operated by the International Speedway Corporation.

Entry list

First practice

Qualifying

Qualifying results

Practice (post-qualifying)

Second practice

Final practice

Race

Stage Results

Stage 1
Laps: 80

Stage 2
Laps: 80

Final Stage Results

Stage 3
Laps: 107

Race statistics
 Lead changes: 8 among different drivers
 Cautions/Laps: 3 for 17
 Red flags: 0
 Time of race: 2 hours, 38 minutes and 2 seconds
 Average speed:

Media

Television
NBC Sports covered the race on the television side. Rick Allen, Jeff Burton, Steve Letarte and Dale Earnhardt Jr. had the call in the booth for the race. Dave Burns, Parker Kligerman, Marty Snider and Kelli Stavast reported from pit lane during the race.

Radio
MRN had the radio call for the race, which was simulcast on Sirius XM NASCAR Radio.

Standings after the race

Manufacturers' Championship standings

Note: Only the first 16 positions are included for the driver standings.

References

2018 in sports in Kansas
Hollywood Casino 400
NASCAR races at Kansas Speedway
Hollywood Casino 400